Alexander Eccles (16 March 1876 – 17 March 1919) was an English cricketer active from 1896 to 1907 who played for Lancashire. He was born and died in Preston. He appeared in 152 first-class matches as a righthanded batsman, scoring 5,129 runs with a highest score of 139 and held 95 catches. He completed six centuries and 22 half-centuries in his career.

Eccles played for Oxford University from 1896 to 1899; and he represented the Gentlemen in 1902. He was the Lancashire club captain for the 1902 season.

Notes

1876 births
1919 deaths
Alumni of Trinity College, Oxford
Cricketers from Preston, Lancashire
English cricketers
Gentlemen cricketers
Lancashire cricketers
Marylebone Cricket Club cricketers
Oxford University cricketers
Oxford University Past and Present cricketers
People educated at Bilton Grange
People educated at Repton School